The 2001 Indian Federation Cup was the 24th season of the Indian Federation Cup. It was held between 18 and 30 August 2001. Mohun Bagan, the defending champions having won the 1998 tournament, the last time it was held, beat Dempo 2–1 in the final.

Match officials
The All India Football Federation named 18 referees for the tournament. Manian of Asian Football Confederation was chosen as referee instructor, S. R. Dev as match commissioner and M. G. Suvarna as referee-in-charge.

Results
In case of a tie at regular time, extra time with golden goal was used. In case scores remain tied even after extra time, penalty shoot-out was used.

Pre-quarterfinals (round of 16)

Quarter-finals

Semi-finals

Final

References

External links
 24th Federation Cup
 24th Federation Cup 2001

Indian Federation Cup seasons
2001–02 domestic association football cups
2001–02 in Indian football